Ballenden  may refer to:

John Ballenden
William Ballenden
Sarah McLeod (Ballenden)

See also
Balanchine
Ballentine (disambiguation)
Ballantyne
Ballantine (surname)
Ballantine
Bellenden
Ballandean, Queensland
Balindean, the spelling used by the Ogilvy-Wedderburn baronets